This is a list of California Vulcans players in the NFL Draft.

Key

Selections

References

Lists of National Football League draftees by college football team

California Vulcans NFL Draft